The Sainte-Anne River (in French: rivière Sainte-Anne) is a tributary of the south coast of the St. Lawrence River located at Gaspésie-Îles-de-la-Madeleine in the La Haute-Gaspésie Regional County Municipality, in Quebec, in Canada.

Presentation 
Four species of fish frequent the Sainte-Anne River. In addition to Atlantic salmon, we find brook trout, rainbow trout and American eel.

Geography 
The Sainte-Anne River has its source in Lac Sainte-Anne which is located in the Lemieux township, in the Notre Dame Mountains, on the northern slope of the watershed with the Petite rivière Cascapédia Ouest which flows south. This last valley is the southern extension of the Sainte-Anne river valley.

Lake Sainte-Anne is watered on the south side by Lake Mimault and on the east side by the Bois stream. Mount Lyall dominates  on the west side with steep cliffs facing the lake. The Chic-Chocs Wildlife Reserve is located on the east side of the lake.

The Sainte-Anne River flows north through Gaspésie National Park. In its course to the north, the Sainte-Anne river crosses the townships of Lemieux, Lesseps, La Potardière, Courcelette and Cap-Chat. At the end of the course, the river crosses the municipality of Sainte-Anne-des-Monts to the north.

The Sainte-Anne River flows on the southern coast of the Gulf of St. Lawrence in the heart of the village of Sainte-Anne-des-Monts in the cove of Sainte-Anne-des-Monts.

Toponymy 
The toponym "rivière Sainte-Anne" was made official on 5 December 1968 at the Commission de toponymie du Québec.

See also 

 Chic-Choc Mountains

References 

Rivers of Gaspésie–Îles-de-la-Madeleine
La Haute-Gaspésie Regional County Municipality